Rüdiger Dornbusch (June 8, 1942 – July 25, 2002) was a German economist who worked in the United States for most of his career.

Early life and education
Dornbusch was born in Krefeld in present-day North Rhine-Westphalia. After completing his secondary education at the Gymnasium am Moltkeplatz in Krefeld, he went to study abroad. He received his Licence en Sciences Politiques from the University of Geneva's Graduate Institute of International Studies in 1966, where he also stayed on for a year as an assistant in economics. He subsequently moved to the United States, where he obtained his Ph.D. in economics from the University of Chicago.

Career
He briefly worked as a lecturer in the Graduate School of Business at the University of Chicago. For two years he stayed at the University of Rochester as an assistant professor in the Department of Economics, followed by a year as associate professor of International Economics, again in the Graduate School of Business of the University of Chicago. In 1975 he moved to MIT, where he was appointed as associate professor in the Department of Economics. In 1984 he became professor of economics. He stayed at MIT until his death in 2002.

Throughout his career his main focus was on international economics, especially monetary policy, macroeconomic development, growth and international trade. According to some of his students and associates his talent was to extract the heart of a problem and make it understandable in simple terms. For example, he explained fluctuations in prices and exchange rates with great clarity (notably with his overshooting model). He succeeded in making a more realistic model than Mundell–Fleming model with regard to a small open economic system, considering exchange rate expectations. He worked also for the International Monetary Fund, making controversial contributions to the development of stabilisation policies, especially for Latin American countries. Along with Sebastián Edwards coined the term macroeconomic populism. For more than 15 years he served as an associate editor of the Quarterly Journal of Economics.

Together with Stanley Fischer he also wrote widely used undergraduate textbooks.

He died, aged sixty, from cancer.

Major works
Macroeconomics, McGraw-Hill, New York, 1990 (with S. Fischer) 5th ed.
International Economic Policy: Theory and Evidence, Johns Hopkins University Press, (edited with J. A. Frenkel.)
Open Economy Macroeconomics, Basic Books, New York, 1980.
Inflation, Debt and Indexation, MIT Press, 1983. (ed. with M. H. Simonsen.)
Financial Policies and the World Capital Market, University of Chicago Press, 1983. (ed. with P. Aspe and M. Obstfeld.)
Economics, McGraw-Hill, New York, 1987, 2nd ed. (with S. Fischer and R. Schmalensee)
Restoring Europe's Prosperity, (with O. Blanchard and R. Layard) MIT Press, 1986.
Dollars, Debts and Deficits, MIT Press, 1987.
Macroeconomics and Finance, (Essays in Honor of Franco Modigliani) MIT Press, 1987, (Ed. with S. Fischer)
The Political Economy of Argentina, 1946–83, Macmillan, 1988. (ed. with G. diTella)
Exchange Rates and Inflation MIT Press, 1988.
Stopping High Inflation (ed. with M. Bruno, G. diTella and S. Fischer), MIT Press, 1988.
The Open Economy: Tools for Policy Makers in Developing Countries (ed. with Leslie Helmers) Oxford University Press, 1988.
Public Debt Management: Theory and History (ed. with Mario Draghi) Cambridge University Press, 1990.
Reform in Eastern Europe (jointly with O. Blanchard et al.) MIT Press, 1991.
Global Warming: Economic Policy Responses (ed. with J. Poterba) MIT Press, 1991.
The Macroeconomics of Populism in Latin America (ed. with S. Edwards). MIT Press, 1991.
East–West Migration (with Layard, Blanchard, and Krugman) MIT Press, 1992.
Postwar Economic Reconstruction and Lessons for the East Today (ed. with W. Nolling and R. Layard) MIT Press, 1993
Stabilization, Debt, and Reform: Policy Analysis For Developing Countries, Prentice Hall, 1993.
Reform, Recovery and Growth (ed. with S. Edwards) University of Chicago Press, 1994.
Financial Opening: Policy Lessons for Korea, (edited with Y. C. Park), Korea Institute of Finance, International Center For Economics Growth, 1995.
Keys to Prosperity: Free Markets, Sound Money, and a Bit of Luck, MIT Press, 2000.

Honors and distinctions
John Simon Guggenheim Fellowship, 1979.
Fellow of the American Academy of Arts and Sciences.
Doctor honoris causa, University of Basel, 1988.
Honorary Professor, Universidad del Pacífico, Lima, Peru, 1989.
Foreign Member, Finnish Academy of Science and Letters, 1992.
Harms Prize, Institute for World Economy, Kiel, 1992.
Honorary doctorate, Catholic University, Lima Peru, 1998.
Distinguished CES Fellow, Center for Economic Studies, University of Munich, 1998.
Concord Prize, Krefeld, 1999
Top 100 Economists in the World according to IDEAS/RePEc

References

External links
 Rudiger Dornbusch Papers, MC-0576. Massachusetts Institute of Technology, Department of Distinctive Collections, Cambridge, Massachusetts.
 Dornbusch page on MIT website
 IDEAS/RePEc
 Dornbusch's opinion commentary archive at Project Syndicate
 

1942 births
2002 deaths
International economists
Trade economists
People from Krefeld
University of Geneva alumni
Graduate Institute of International and Development Studies alumni
University of Chicago alumni
MIT Sloan School of Management faculty
20th-century American writers
20th-century  German  economists
21st-century  German economists
Fellows of the Econometric Society
20th-century German male writers
Distinguished Fellows of the American Economic Association
German male non-fiction writers